The Smith & Wesson models 619 and 620 are seven-shot revolvers introduced by the Smith & Wesson company in 2005. The 619 has fixed rear sights while the 620 comes with adjustable rear sights and a different handgrip.

These revolvers are often mistaken for members of the 686 family. In actuality, they are descendants of the model 65 and model 66. The 65 and 66 models were discontinued, and the 619 and 620 filled their place as the next generation. They were updated to current Smith & Wesson standards with the addition of a key-lock safety as well as seven-round cylinders. The K-Frame of the 65 and 66 was replaced with the newer, reinforced L-Frame.

620 vs 686P 

These handguns share many common traits but are easily distinguished by key differences. Both models are based on the Smith & Wesson L-Frame and are available in 4" barrels with 7 shot capacity. The 686 features a full-underlug barrel made of one piece whereas the 620 sports a half-lug and two piece barrel. The 620 weighs in at 37.9oz, slightly lighter than the 686's 38oz. The lighter model also shaves 1/8" off of the 686's 9" overall length.

References 

Smith & Wesson revolvers
Revolvers of the United States
.357 Magnum firearms
.38 Special firearms